Berlandiera is a genus of flowering plants in the family Asteraceae.

The name honours explorer Jean-Louis Berlandier (1803–1851). The genus is distributed in the United States and Mexico. Species are known generally as greeneyes.

Description
These are perennial herbs and subshrubs, sometimes with annual stems growing from a woody base or taproot. They are a few centimeters tall to well over a meter. The herbage is usually hairy and may be rough or soft in texture. The alternately arranged leaves have variously shaped blades that may be lobed or divided. The flower heads are solitary or borne in wide arrays. There are usually about 8 ray florets, but there may be 2 to 13 per head. They are yellowish on the upper surface but the undersides may be green, red, or maroon, or have darker veins. There are many disc florets in shades of yellow, red, or maroon. The fruit is a hairy black cypsela that is shed from the plant with the remnants of disc florets and phyllaries still attached to it.

Species
 Accepted species
 Berlandiera × betonicifolia (Hook.) Small (B. texana × B. pumila) - Texas Louisiana Oklahoma
 Berlandiera × humilis Small - Florida
 Berlandiera lyrata Benth. – chocolate flower, chocolate daisy, lyreleaf greeneyes - Arizona New Mexico Texas Utah Oklahoma Kansas Colorado, Chihuahua, Coahuila, Durango, Jalisco, Nuevo León, San Luis Potosí, Tamaulipas, Zacatecas, Aguascalientes
 Berlandiera × macrophylla (A.Gray) M.E.Jones - Arizona New Mexico Texas
 Berlandiera monocephala (B. L. Turner) Pinkava - Arizona New Mexico Chihuahua, Sonora
 Berlandiera pumila (Michx.) Nutt. – soft greeneyes - Texas LA Oklahoma Arkansas Alabama Georgia Florida South Carolina North Carolina
 Berlandiera subacaulis (Nutt.) Nutt – Florida greeneyes - Florida
 Berlandiera texana DC. – Texas greeneyes - New Mexico Texas Oklahoma Kansas Missouri

References

External links
 USDA PLANTS Profile

 
Flora of North America
Asteraceae genera